Comin' Home Baby! is a 1962 studio album by Mel Tormé.

Track listing
 "Comin' Home Baby!" (Bob Dorough, Ben Tucker) – 2:41
 "Dat Dere" (Oscar Brown, Jr., Bobby Timmons) – 2:58
 "The Lady's in Love with You" (Burton Lane, Frank Loesser) – 3:01
 "Hi-Fly" (Jon Hendricks, Randy Weston) – 3:13
 "Puttin' on the Ritz" (Irving Berlin) – 2:23
 "Walkin'" (Richard Carpenter) – 2:59
 "Moanin'" (Hendricks, Timmons) – 3:03
 "Sing You Sinners" (Sam Coslow, W. Franke Harling) – 2:27
 "Whisper Not" (Leonard Feather, Benny Golson) – 2:49
 "On Green Dolphin Street" (Bronislaw Kaper, Ned Washington) – 2:56
 "Sidney's Soliloquy" (Jimmy Wisner) – 2:30
 "Right Now" (Herbie Mann, Carl Sigman) – 2:12

Personnel
Recorded July 11 - September 13, 1962, in Los Angeles:
 Mel Tormé – vocals, drums
 Shorty Rogers – arranger and conductor
 Claus Ogerman – arranger and conductor on "Comin' Home Baby!" and "Right Now"
 Joe Burnett – trumpet
 Ollie Mitchell – trumpet
 Al Porcino – trumpet
 Ray Triscari – trumpet
 Milt Bernhart – trombone
 Harry Betts – trombone
 Kenny Shroyer – trombone
 John Kitzmiller – tuba
 Bud Shank – woodwind
 Buddy Collette – woodwind
 Bob Cooper – woodwind
 Bill Hood – woodwind
 Gene Estes – vibraphone
 Mike Wofford – piano
 Joe Mondragon – bass
 Larry Bunker – drums
 The Cookies – backing vocals
 Nesuhi Ertegun – producer ("supervised by")
 Bones Howe and Tom Dowd – recording engineers
 Nat Hentoff – liner notes

References

1962 albums
Atlantic Records albums
Mel Tormé albums
Albums produced by Nesuhi Ertegun
Albums arranged by Claus Ogerman
Albums conducted by Claus Ogerman
Albums arranged by Shorty Rogers
Albums conducted by Shorty Rogers